The Mayodan Millers was the final and primary name of the Bi-State League baseball team based in Mayodan, North Carolina, United States that played from 1934 to 1941. They were affiliated with the Philadelphia Phillies in 1939. The franchise previously played in the Bi-State League as the Mayodan Senators (1934, 1937), Mayodan Mills  (1935) and Mayodan Orphans (1936).

References

Baseball teams established in 1938
Baseball teams disestablished in 1941
1938 establishments in North Carolina
1941 disestablishments in North Carolina
Defunct minor league baseball teams
Professional baseball teams in North Carolina
Philadelphia Phillies minor league affiliates
Rockingham County, North Carolina
Defunct baseball teams in North Carolina
Bi-State League teams